The Mauritius Scout Association is a Scouting organisation in Mauritius. The association was founded in 1971 and became a member of the World Organization of the Scout Movement (WOSM) in 1971. The coeducational association had 2,782 members (as of 2010).

History
In 1912, 17 year old Samuel Blunt de Burgh Edwards formed the first patrol of Scouts in Mauritius and later became the first leader. He is regarded as the founder of Scouting in Mauritius. A number of Scout troops developed. In 1913,  The Boy Scouts Association of the United Kingdom established its Mauritian Local Association which became its Mauritian Branch. This branch consisted of different affiliated associations, separated by faiths.

Upon the independence of Mauritius in 1968, two reports were launched to ensure the development of Scouting in Mauritius. In 1971, The Mauritius Scout Association was constituted as an autonomous organisation and single successor to The Scout Association's Mauritian Branch and the different religious Scout associations. The association was admitted to WOSM in the same year. The association was incorporated in 1976.

Program
The aim of the Mauritius Scout Association is "to encourage the physical, mental, social, emotional and spiritual development of young people so that they may take a constructive place in society". Self-reliance, service and adventure and Scout craft are major features of the program. Proficiency badges are divided into four categories, interest, pursuit, service and instructor.

Most Scout groups are sponsored by religious bodies, schools, colleges, and others institutions. All Scouts help during religious processions, regardless of creed, and carry sick people at the Fête Annuelle des Malades (Annual Festival of the Ill).

Community services including helping to evacuate flooded areas during cyclones, assisting in refugee centers, cleaning roads and repairing houses. Scouts are also involved in a variety of community development projects.

National Youth Scout Council
NYSC 2020-2021:
 President:Yoan Bayaram
 Vice-President: Mathieu Lam Kai Leung
 Secretary: Lorie Alfred
 Vice-Secretary: Mégane Gaiqui 
 tresurer: Jeff Fricot
 Vice-treasurer: Loïc Marie-Louise
 OC representative: Nigel Esso
 Odell Legrand
 Rickel Ratsimandrata

Sections
The association is divided in four sections:
 Cub Scouts (ages 8 to 11)
 Scouts (ages 12 to 15)
 Venture Scouts (ages 15 to 18)
 Rover Scouts (ages 19 to 23)

Scout Law, Promise and Motto
As most Mauritians speak French, the French version of Scout Law, Promise and Motto are more frequently used than the English ones. Both versions are part of the association's constitution.

The Scout Motto is Toujours Prêt or Be Prepared.

Scout Promise
 Sur mon honneur je promets de faire de mon mieux, pour servir Dieu et mon pays, d'aider les autres, et d'observer la Loi Scoute.
 On my honour, I promise that I will do my best, to do my duty to God and to my country, to help other people and to keep the Scout Law.

Scout Law
 Un Scout inspire confiance. - A Scout is to be trusted.
 Un Scout est loyal. - A Scout is loyal.
 Un Scout est amical et chevalresque. - A Scout is friendly and considerate.
 Un Scout est le frère de tout autre Scouts. - A Scout is a brother to all Scouts.
 Un Scout affronte les difficultés avec courage. - A Scout has courage in all difficulties.
 Un Scout fait bon usage de son temps et prend soin de ses biens et ceux des autres. - A Scout makes good use of his time and is careful of his possessions and property.
 Un Scout se respecte et respecte les autres. - A Scout has respect for himself and for others.

See also
 The Mauritius Girl Guides Association

References

Further reading
 World Scout Bureau (1979), Scouting 'Round the World. 1979 edition. 
 World Organization of the Scout Movement (1990), Scouting 'Round the World. 1990 edition.

External links 
 

World Organization of the Scout Movement member organizations
Scouting and Guiding in Mauritius
Youth organizations established in 1971